Events in the year 2022 in the Comoros.

Incumbents 

 President: Azali Assoumani
 President of the Assembly: Moustadroine Abdou

Events 
Ongoing — COVID-19 pandemic in the Comoros

26 August - President Azali Assoumani held a video-conference with the prime minister of Japan, Fumio Kishida.

Africa Cup of Nations 
10 January - In the Africa Cup of Nations, Comoros loses 1-0 to Gabon.

18 January - Comoros wins 3-2 over Ghana.

24 January - In the Round of 16, Comoros is eliminated after a loss of 2-2 to Cameroon.

References 

2022 in the Comoros
2020s in the Comoros
Years of the 21st century in the Comoros
Comoros
Comoros